Asolene spixii is a species of freshwater snail, an aquatic gastropod mollusk in the family Ampullariidae, the apple snails.

The specific name spixii is in honour of German biologist Johann Baptist von Spix.

Distribution
Brazil, Argentina and Uruguay.

References

External links 

Ampullariidae
Gastropods described in 1838